Cheriazheekkal or Cheriazheeckal is a village in the Alappad panchayat in the town of Karunagapalli in Kerala, India. It is located between the Arabian Sea on the west and backwaters to the East. Cheriazheekkal is primarily made up of fishing, farming, and other traditional labour communities along with a budding tourism sector.

Known for its twin temples, Cheriazheekkal is steeped in legends. The Sri Kashi Vishwanathar Temple is also known as the Deccan Kashi Temple, after the legend of the priest who installed the Sivalingam that he found in the Ganges, at Cheriazheekal. But it is also believed that the place housed a temple dedicated to Lord Vishnu, built some 2,000 years ago.

References

Villages in Kollam district